The Association of Science Fiction and Fantasy Artists, ASFA, is a non-profit, educational association, whose membership is made up of amateur and professional artists, art directors, art show managers, publishers and collectors involved in the visual arts of science fiction, fantasy, mythology and related topics. It is currently based in Harrisburg, Pennsylvania.
 
ASFA's purpose is to encourage and develop amateur artistic talent, educate the public, publishers, patrons of the arts and anyone interested in works of these particularly types of art and craftsmanship in the rights, needs and problems of the people involved in the creation of this material.
 
Each year ASFA gives out the Chesley Awards, named for the astronomical artist, Chesley Bonestell. The Chesleys were started in 1985 as a means for the SF and Fantasy art community to recognize individual works and achievements during the previous year.

Further reading
The Frank Collection: A Showcase of the World's Finest Fantastic Art, Jane and Howard Frank. Paper Tiger Books, 1999.

External links
 ASFA Homepage

References

Fantastic art
Science fiction organizations
Organizations based in Harrisburg, Pennsylvania
1976 establishments in the United States
Fantasy organizations